is a railway station on the Ōito Line in  Otari, Kitaazumi District, Nagano Prefecture, Japan, operated by West Japan Railway Company (JR West).

Lines
Kita-Otari Station is served by the Ōito Line and is 8.4 kilometers from the Minami-Otari Station, and 78.5 kilometers from the starting point of the line at Matsumoto Station.

Station layout
The station consists of one ground-level side platform serving a single bi-directional track. The station is unattended.

History
Kita-Otari Station opened on 15 August 1957. With the privatization of Japanese National Railways (JNR) on 1 April 1987, the station came under the control of JR West.

Surrounding area
Raiba Onsen
National Route 148

See also
 List of railway stations in Japan

External links

 JR West station information 

Railway stations in Nagano Prefecture
Railway stations in Japan opened in 1957
Ōito Line
Stations of West Japan Railway Company